"Friends!" is the seventeenth single released by Nami Tamaki on July 29, 2009. It is her second single of 2009. The song was used as the Dariya beauty salon chain 'Palty' campaign CM song, as well as the NTV news show NNN News Real Time August theme song.

The single was released in three versions: two limited CD+DVD versions and a regular version. Each version had a unique B-side. The track  was written for Tamaki by the electronic band Hi-Fi Camp. The song  was used as the Nintendo Wii game Arc Rise Fantasia's theme song.

Music video
The PV opens with Tamaki walking through a darkly lit grocery store, picking up various items off the shelves. It then shows her winking at the camera. The music then starts to play as Tamaki dances in a brightly lit grocery store with two of her friends. It occasional shows clips of Tamaki dancing and singing in with a pink background behind her as well as a mirror. The song ends with Tamaki smiling at the camera.

Track listings

Standard Version

Limited Edition A (CD+DVD)

CD

DVD
Friends! (music video)

Limited Edition B (CD+DVD)

CD

DVD
Friends! (Dance PV Version)
Friends! (Making of)

References

External links
tamaki-nami.net

2009 singles
Nami Tamaki songs
2009 songs
Universal Music Japan singles